Greenham is a village and civil parish in Berkshire, England. Greenham commences immediately south-east of Newbury and is in West Berkshire. It was recorded in the Domesday Book as Greneham.

Governance
Greenham was originally a tithing in the parish of Thatcham. In 1878, the northern part was given to Newbury and the southern part became its own parish. West Berkshire administers local government; certain minor local services such as footpaths and sports facilities received grants from the precept of the parish council, formed of residents. The population of the civil parish was 937 at the 2011 Census.

Amenities
Greenham's parish church of St Mary was built between 1875 and 1895 by Henry Woodyer in the Early English style. It is a Grade II* listed building. There is a public open space by the church, called Audrey's Meadow after local councillor, Audrey Appleby, administered by the Berkshire, Buckinghamshire and Oxfordshire Wildlife Trust. Schools in the parish include Mary Hare primary school in the village itself, Highwood Copse primary school, St Gabriel's School at Sandleford Priory and Newbury College.

Transport
Services are augmented on race days. The A339 from Basingstoke runs along the southern edge of the parish before heading north along the former alignment of the A34 into the centre of Newbury. The Kennet and Avon Canal runs along the north-western edge of the parish. The racecourse incorporates an airfield for general aviation use on race days.

Housing
An area separating southern Newbury from Greenham, sometimes referred to by locals as the 'Greenham Gap', has historically been free of housing, but a development of 36 houses was completed in this area in 2020 and outline plans for further housing were approved in 2017 and 2018, amidst concerns about traffic management and local rights of way.

Industry
Newbury Racecourse is within the northern border of the parish. The Greenham Industrial Estate is in the south-eastern corner, beyond the former RAF Greenham Common which occupied much of the common between 1942 and 1992.

Demography

See also
 List of civil parishes in Berkshire

References

External links

 Royal Berkshire History: Greenham
 A History of RAF Greenham Common

Villages in Berkshire
West Berkshire District
Civil parishes in Berkshire
Thatcham